Let's Sing with Popeye is a 1934 Screen Songs animated short, produced by Fleischer Studios and directed by Dave Fleischer.

The song featured in this cartoon was the Popeye theme song "I'm Popeye the Sailor Man", written by Sammy Lerner. The animation for this film is taken from the first Popeye cartoon, Popeye the Sailor, which was originally presented as part of the Betty Boop series.

The entire cartoon is approximately two minutes long, with over half of that given to the credits and the bouncing ball. This shorter than normal cartoon was produced as a regular weekly feature for Paramount's Saturday morning matinee "Popeye Club".

History

Summary
Popeye is singing his theme song as he strolls along the deck of a sailing ship. He punctuates the lines of the song with three demonstrations of his strength. With a single punch, he reduces the ship's anchor to a pile of fish hooks. The large ship's clock meets a similar fate, ending as an assortment of watches and alarm clocks. Finally, a small mast is reduced to clothes pins.

The animated portion of the cartoon ends after about 45 seconds, and the rest of the cartoon presents the words of the song and the "famous bouncing ball" so that the audience can "Sing with Popeye".

Notes
In 1935, Paramount added to Popeye's popularity by sponsoring the "Popeye Club" as part of their Saturday morning matinee program. Let's Sing with Popeye was a regular part of the weekly meetings, along with other cartoons, movies, prize giveaways and other activities. Paramount provided a manual to theatre owners, telling them how to organize a Popeye Club, but the specific details were left to the local theatre owners and varied from one theatre to another.

Availability 
This cartoon with the original Paramount mountain logo opening title and the original Paramount inkwell closing title is available on DVD as a special feature on disc four of the DVD collection Popeye the Sailor: 1933–1938, Volume 1.

References

External links
Let's Sing with Popeye at IMDB
Let's Sing with Popeye at the Big Cartoon Database
Paramount's Popeye Club

Let's Sing With Popeye
1934 short films
1934 animated films
Paramount Pictures short films
American black-and-white films
Fleischer Studios short films
Short films directed by Dave Fleischer
1930s English-language films
American animated short films
Sing-along
1930s American films